The 2023 IFSC Climbing World Cup is the 35th edition of the international sport climbing competition series organised by the International Federation of Sport Climbing (IFSC), held in 12 locations. There are 18 events: six bouldering, six lead, and six speed events. The series begins on 23 April in Hachioji, Japan with the first bouldering competitions of the season, and will conclude on 23 September in Wujiang, China.

The top 3 in each competition receive medals, and the overall winners are awarded trophies. At the end of the season, an overall ranking is determined based upon points, which athletes are awarded for finishing in the top 40 of each individual event.

Scheduling 
The IFSC announced the 2023 World Cup schedule in September 2022.

Overview

See also
2023 IFSC Climbing World Championships

References

IFSC Climbing World Cup
World Cup